is a Japanese former professional baseball outfielder in Japan's Nippon Professional Baseball. He played with the Yomiuri Giants from 2009 to 2018 and for the Tohoku Rakuten Golden Eagles in 2019.

External links

Career statistics and player information from Baseball-Reference

1990 births
Living people
Baseball people from Sendai
Nippon Professional Baseball outfielders
Yomiuri Giants players
Tohoku Rakuten Golden Eagles players
Melbourne Aces players
Japanese expatriate baseball players in Australia
Japanese baseball coaches
Nippon Professional Baseball coaches